Nakki may refer to:
 Näkki, a water spirit in Finnic mythologies
 Nakki (crater), a crater on Callisto
 Nakki Lake, a lake in India